New Zealand is a hamlet in the civil parish of Aylesbury, Buckinghamshire, England, on the A413 heading out to the north of Aylesbury town centre.  It gained its name from a breed of cow that was supposedly farmed there.  It has been swallowed up by the urban growth of Aylesbury, but a pub of the same name remains.

External links 
 Map at streetmap.co.uk, with the arrow pointing to the location of New Zealand

Aylesbury
Hamlets in Buckinghamshire